The biennial Artificial Evolution (AE) conference is held in France every two years (odd years), in early fall. The Parallel Problem Solving from Nature (PPSN) conference is held at the same period (early fall), but even years. EA is dedicated to techniques that simulate natural evolution.

Proceedings of AE are published by Springer-Verlag in their LNCS serie.

Artificial Evolution was originally initiated as a forum for the French-speaking evolutionary computation community, and the first conference, organized by Jean-Marc Alliot, Evelyne Lutton, Edmund Ronald and Marc Schoenauer, was held in Toulouse in 1994 under the name Evolution Artificielle. It is the only conference held an even year, and the only one with proceedings not edited by Springer (they were edited by Cepadues). It became an international conference the following year (1995) in Brest, under the name Artificial Evolution. It is still referred sometimes as Evolution Artificielle (French for Artificial Evolution) however.

List of AE conferences
 EA-1994 took place in Toulouse
 AE-1995 took place in Brest, LNCS 1063
 AE-1997 took place in Nimes, LNCS 1363
 AE-1999 took place in Dunkerque, LNCS 1829
 AE-2001 took place in Le Creusot, LNCS 2310
 AE-2003 took place in Marseilles, LNCS 2936
 AE-2005 took place in Lille, LNCS 3871
 AE-2007 took place in Tours, LNCS 4926
 AE-2009 took place in Strasbourg, LNCS 5975
 AE-2011 took place in Angers, LNCS 7401
 AE-2013 took place in Bordeaux, LNCS 8752
 AE-2015 took place in Lyon, LNCS 9554
 AE-2017 took place in Paris, LNCS 10764

Notes

External links
web page for AE 2017

Artificial intelligence conferences